Trista Mateer is an American writer and visual artist from Westminster, Maryland. She won the Goodreads Choice Award in 2015 for poetry with The Dogs I Have Kissed. Her collection Aphrodite Made Me Do It was also voted one of the best books of the year by Goodreads users in 2019. She has been invited to speak on multiple occasions about cultivating a social media presence for poetry and for the importance of queer representation in media.

Bibliography 
Artemis Made Me Do It (Central Avenue Publishing, 2022)
girl, isolated: poems, notes on healing, etc. (independently published, 2021)
When the Stars Wrote Back (Random House, 2020)
Aphrodite Made Me Do It (Central Avenue Publishing, 2019)
Honeybee (Central Avenue Publishing, 2018)
The Dogs I Have Kissed (independently published, 2015)

References

Living people
Year of birth missing (living people)
21st-century American poets
21st-century American women writers
American women poets